Rabat-Salé-Kénitra is one of the twelve administrative regions of Morocco. It is situated in north-western Morocco and has a population of 4,580,866 (2014 census). The capital is Rabat.

History
Rabat-Salé-Kenitra was formed in September 2015 by merging Rabat-Salé-Zemmour-Zaer with the region of Gharb-Chrarda-Béni Hssen.

Administrative divisions
The region is made up into the following provinces and prefectures:

 Rabat Prefecture
 Salé Prefecture
 Skhirate-Témara Prefecture
 Kénitra Province
 Sidi Kacem Province
 Sidi Slimane Province
 Khemisset Province

References